Biggie Smalls (1972-1997) was an American rapper.

Biggie may also refer to:

Nickname or stage name 
 Biggie Kapeta (1956–1999), Zimbabwean sculptor
 Biggie Tembo Jr. (born 1988), Zimbabwean musician
 Clarence Munn (1908–1975), American football coach
 Grover Simcox (1867–1966), American illustrator, naturalist, and polymath
 Marshall Goldberg (1917–2006), American football halfback

Characters 
 Biggie, from the 1996 film Temptress Moon
 Biggie Cheese, a fictional mouse rapper from the 2006 animated film Barnyard: The Original Party Animals
 Biggie Knuft, from the 1972 novel The Water-Method Man by John Irving
 Biggie Smalls, from the 1975 film Let's Do It Again
 Biggie, a troll from the 2016 animated film Trolls

Other uses 
 Biggie, a size of drink and fries from Wendy's

See also 
 
 Big (disambiguation)
 Big E (disambiguation)
 Biggy (disambiguation)

Lists of people by nickname